Grayton Beach is a small, historic beach village on the Florida Panhandle Gulf coast halfway between Destin and Panama City in Walton County and adjacent to Grayton Beach State Park. Collectively, the area is known as the “Beaches of South Walton,” with South Walton referring to the southern portion of Walton County below the Choctawhatchee Bay.

Geography

The village is in the center of a  stretch of coastal dune lakes. Western Lake is one of the nearby coastal dune lakes. Most land north of County Road 30A in the Grayton Beach community is state park.

History
When Army Major Charles T. Gray built his homestead in 1885, the federal government owned much of the land and few people had reason to settle here; the soil was too sandy to farm and there were better timberlands inland. The closest settlement was about five miles to the north at Point Washington on Choctawhatchee Bay.  The town of Grayton Beach was founded in 1890 when Army Generals William Miller and William Wilson moved in and mapped out the village; they named their new community in honor of Gray.

At the beginning of the 20th century, Grayton Beach attempted to become a popular vacation retreat for families from the inland towns of Northwest Florida and Alabama, but reaching Grayton Beach from the north was not easy. There were no bridges over the southern parts of the Choctawhatchee River, and what roads existed were merely sand trails crossing miles of low-lying forests.

In the 1930s, the area became easier to reach, with the construction of Highway 98, the Highway 331 bridge, and the Intracoastal Waterway.  In the 1940s, the Choctawhatchee Electric Cooperative brought electricity to the village. In 1942, the U. S. Coast Guard established a 40-man station here, with the federal government renting many of the homes for barracks and offices.

In 1967, the state used its land east of the town to create the Grayton Beach State Recreation Area. In 1985, after years of lobbying by residents, Florida bought the village's beach front and the dunes and forest land to the west and north. When the state tried to trade away parts of the 1985 purchase for land at Topsail Hill, many Grayton Beach residents and neighbors howled in protest. The land swap fell through when the state and Topsail's owners could not come to terms.

The most recent hurricane to bring the Gulf of Mexico over dunes and into Grayton Beach was Opal in 1995. Western Lake overflowed, leaving water knee deep in many houses, and had residents washing loads of sand and mud out of their homes.  The only original building in the village is a two-story home, known today as the Wash-A-Way, at the end of County Road 283. The building got its name when the hurricane of 1926 swept away its foundation.

External links
 Grayton Beach State Park
 Walton County, Florida

Unincorporated communities in Walton County, Florida
Populated places established in 1890
Unincorporated communities in Florida
Populated coastal places in Florida on the Gulf of Mexico
Beaches of Walton County, Florida
Beaches of Florida